Pleurofusia crassinoda is an extinct species of sea snail, a marine gastropod mollusk in the family Drilliidae.

Distribution
This extinct species was found in France.

References

 Des Moulins, Charles. Révision de quelques espèces de pleurotomes... chez Th. Lafargue, libraire, 1842.
 Lozouet P. (2015). Nouvelles espèces de gastéropodes (Mollusca: Gastropoda) de l'Oligocène et du Miocène inférieur d'Aquitaine (Sud-Ouest de la France). Partie 5. Cossmanniana. 17: 15–84

External links

crassinoda
Gastropods described in 1842